The 1883 Selwyn by-election was a by-election held on 6 April 1883 during the 8th New Zealand Parliament in the Canterbury electorate of .

The by-election was caused by the resignation of the incumbent MP John Hall.

The by-election was won by Edward Lee.

A government supporter, he was opposed by the Hon. Edward Richardson and John McLachlan.

Results
The following table gives the election result:

Notes

Selwyn 1883
1883 elections in New Zealand
Politics of Canterbury
April 1883 events